The 1972 visit by United States President Richard Nixon to the People's Republic of China was an important strategic and diplomatic overture that marked the culmination of the Nixon administration's resumption of harmonious relations between the United States (U.S.) and the People's Republic of China (PRC) after years of diplomatic isolation. The seven-day official visit to three Chinese cities was the first time a U.S. president had visited the PRC; Nixon's arrival in Beijing ended 25 years of no communication or diplomatic ties between the two countries and was the key step in normalizing relations between the U.S. and the PRC. Nixon visited the PRC to gain more leverage over relations with the Soviet Union. The normalization of ties culminated in 1979, when the U.S. established full diplomatic relations with the PRC.

When the Chinese Communist Party gained power over mainland China in 1949 and the Kuomintang retreated to the island of Taiwan after the de facto end of the Chinese Civil War, the United States continued to recognize the Republic of China (ROC) as the sole government of China, now based out of Taipei. Before his election as president in 1968, former Vice President Richard Nixon hinted at establishing a new relationship with the PRC. Early in his first term, Nixon, through his National Security Adviser Henry Kissinger, sent subtle overtures hinting at warmer relations to the government of the PRC. After a series of these overtures by both countries, Kissinger flew on secret diplomatic missions to Beijing in 1971, where he met with Chinese premier Zhou Enlai. On July 15, 1971, the President announced on live television that he would visit the PRC the following year.

The week-long visit, from February 21 to 28, 1972, allowed the American public to view images of mainland China for the first time in over two decades. Throughout the week the President and his senior advisers engaged in substantive discussions with the PRC leadership, including a meeting with CCP chairman Mao Zedong, while First Lady Pat Nixon toured schools, factories and hospitals in the cities of Beijing, Hangzhou and Shanghai with the large American press corps in tow. Nixon dubbed his visit "the week that changed the world", a descriptor that continues to echo in the political lexicon. Repercussions of the Nixon visit continue to this day; near-immediate results included a significant shift in the Cold War balance, driving an ideological wedge between the Soviet Union and the People's Republic of China, resulting in significant Soviet concessions and its eventual fall.

Today, the relationship between the People's Republic of China and the United States of America is now one of the most important and vital bilateral relationships in the world, and every successive U.S. president, except for Jimmy Carter and Joe Biden (although he has already visited when he was Vice President), has visited the PRC. The trip is consistently ranked by historians, scholars, and journalists as one of the most important—if not the most important—visits by a U.S. president anywhere in the world. Also, a "Nixon to China" moment has since become a metaphor to refer to the ability of a politician with an unassailable reputation among their supporters for representing and defending their values to take actions that would draw their criticism and even opposition if taken by someone without those credentials.

Visit

Historical background

Improved relations with the Soviet Union and the PRC are often cited as the most successful diplomatic achievements of Nixon's presidency. After World War II, Americans saw relations between the United States and the Soviet Union deteriorating, the Soviets consolidating communist allies over much of Eastern Europe, and the potential victory of CCP forces in the Chinese Civil War. The American ruling class was concerned that communists might dominate schools or labor unions.

In China, from the beginning of the Sino-Soviet split in 1956, there was a perceived necessity for external allies to counterbalance the power of the Soviet Union.

The reason for opening up China was for the U.S. to gain more leverage over relations with the Soviet Union. Resolving the Vietnam War was a particularly important factor. National Security Council staffer (and later U.S. Ambassador to China) Winston Lord noted that, by flexibly dealing with both the Soviet Union and China, the United States sought to pressure both countries to reduce their support for North Vietnam in their new prioritization of relations with the United States.

One of the main reasons Richard Nixon became the 1952 vice-presidential candidate on the Dwight Eisenhower ticket was his strong anti-communist stance. Despite this, in 1972 Nixon became the first U.S. president to visit mainland China while in office. Ulysses S. Grant visited China on a world tour after leaving office, meeting Prince Gong and Li Hongzhang. Two decades before becoming president Herbert Hoover lived in China as a mining manager from 1899 to 1901, being also somewhat proficient in Mandarin. Eisenhower made a state visit to Taiwan in 1960, during the period when the United States recognized the Republic of China government in Taipei as the sole government of China.

Readiness

In July 1971, President Nixon's National Security Advisor Henry Kissinger secretly visited Beijing during a trip to Pakistan, and laid the groundwork for Nixon's visit to China. This meeting was arranged and facilitated by Pakistan through its strong diplomatic channels with China. Transcripts of White House meetings and once confidential documents show Nixon began working to open a channel of communication with Beijing from his first day in the White House. For this ambitious goal to be reached President Nixon had carried out a series of carefully calibrated moves through Communist China's allies Romania and Pakistan.

Travel to China

President Nixon, his wife, and their entourage left the White House on February 17, 1972, spending a night in Kaneohe Marine Corps Air Station, Oahu, Hawaii. They arrived the next day in Guam at 5 pm, where they spent the night at Nimitz Hill, the residence of the Commander, Naval Forces, Marianas. The next morning, February 21, at 7 am the Nixons left Guam for Shanghai. After 4 hours in the air, the Nixons arrived in Shanghai. From Shanghai, the Nixons traveled to Beijing.

Meeting with Mao

From February 21 to 28, 1972, U.S. President Richard Nixon traveled to Beijing, Hangzhou, and Shanghai. Almost as soon as the American president arrived in the Chinese capital, CCP Chairman Mao Zedong summoned him for a quick meeting. Kissinger and his assistant Winston Lord were also present. To avoid embarrassing Secretary of State William P. Rogers, Nixon requested to the Chinese for Lord to be cropped out of all the official photographs of the meeting. Although Nixon was in China for a week, this would be his only meeting with Mao.

Unknown to Nixon and the rest of the American diplomats at the time, Mao was in poor health and he had been hospitalized for several weeks up to only nine days before Nixon's arrival. Nevertheless, Mao felt well enough to insist to his officials that he would meet with Nixon upon his arrival. Upon being introduced to Nixon for the first time, Mao, speaking through his translator, said to Nixon: "I believe our old friend Chiang Kai-shek would not approve of this". Mao also joked that "I voted for you during your last election." Nixon, charmed, said "you voted for the lesser of two evils," and Mao replied, "I like rightists, I am comparatively happy when these people on the right come into power."

As an observer of the Mao–Nixon meeting, Lord noted Mao's peasant-like sensibilities and self-deprecating humor. Mao spoke simply and inelegantly, but clearly communicated approval of the visit and its diplomatic utility. Lord described Mao's purposeful and episodic language as a "very skillful performance."

Other activities 

Due to secrecy surrounding diplomatic negotiations during the visit and various media restrictions, American press in China often followed Pat Nixon's sightseeing.

Nixon held many meetings with Chinese Premier Zhou Enlai during the trip, and made visits to the Great Wall, Hangzhou, and Shanghai. Nixon's porcelain swans statue, a gift to Mao, was presented along the way in the gift-giving ceremony.

February 27 marked the joint issuing of the Shanghai Communiqué, a statement of Chinese and American foreign policy views that has remained the basis of Sino-American bilateral relations. In the communiqué, both nations pledged to work toward the full normalization of diplomatic policy and acknowledged longstanding differences.

Nixon concluded the visit in the morning of February 28, when he left China on a flight to Anchorage, Alaska.

Results

The Chinese agreed to a peaceful settlement of the Taiwan question. The statement enabled the U.S. and PRC to temporarily set aside the "crucial question obstructing the normalization of relations" concerning the political status of Taiwan and to open trade and other contacts. However, the U.S. continued to maintain official relations with the government of the Republic of China in Taiwan and did not break off until 1979, when the U.S. established full diplomatic relations with the PRC.

While in Shanghai, Nixon spoke about what this meant for the two countries in the future:

This was the week that changed the world, as what we have said in that Communique is not nearly as important as what we will do in the years ahead to build a bridge across 16,000 miles and 22 years of hostilities which have divided us in the past. And what we have said today is that we shall build that bridge.

Nixon and his aides carefully planned the trip to have the biggest possible impact on television audiences in the United States. The media coverage of the trip was overwhelmingly positive. Later interviews with correspondents who traveled with the President show how eager they were to be on the trip, which some labeled the most important summit meeting ever.

John T. Downey and Richard Fecteau, CIA operatives who were held captive in China from November 1952, were released after Nixon's visit to China.

Within a year after Nixon's visit, a number of U.S. allies including Japan, Great Britain, and West Germany had broken relations with Taiwan in order to establish them with China.

Aftermath

Nixon's visit to China was well-planned. The media presented Nixon communicating with Chinese government officials, attending dinners, and being accorded tours with other people of influence.

Max Frankel of The New York Times received the Pulitzer Prize for International Reporting for his coverage of the event.

The aftermath of the Watergate scandal later in 1972 led Nixon to deprioritize further diplomatic efforts with the PRC. This resulted in putting off deliberations over the establishment of a Beijing-Washington hotline, which was first proposed during the visit to China and discussed between Kissinger and Zhou in November 1973 meetings. The Beijing-Washington hotline was later created in 2007.

The visit inspired John Adams' 1987 opera Nixon in China. It was also the subject of a PBS documentary film, American Experience: Nixon's China Game.

Nixon's visit played a role in leading to the September 1972 Japan-China Joint Communiqué. In his discussion with Japanese PM Kakuei Tanaka, Mao Zedong recounted, "I told Nixon, 'I voted for you when you ran for President. You still don't know.'" Mao said that he had no interest in Japan's Communist Party, and "also voted" for Kakuei Tanaka.

Nixon's visit played a role in opening China to U.S. trade eventually putting downward pressure on U.S. inflation.

In 1979, there was a state visit by Deng Xiaoping to the United States from January to February, the first official visit to the U.S. by a senior leader of the P.R.C. Deng met with then-sitting President Jimmy Carter and ex-President Nixon at a state dinner in the White House.

See also
Nixon goes to China
Nixon in China, opera based on the historical visit 
Ping-pong diplomacy
Dixie mission
Visit by Deng Xiaoping to the United States

General:
China and the United Nations

References

Further reading 
 Burr, William (1999) The Kissinger Transcripts, The New Press
 Dallek, Robert (2007). Nixon and Kissinger: Partners in Power. New York: HarperCollins.
 Drew, Elizabeth (2007). Richard M. Nixon. New York: Times Books.
 Ladley, Eric (2002) Nixon's China Trip, Writer's Club Press; (2007) Balancing Act: How Nixon Went to China and Remained a Conservative.
 MacMillan, Margaret (2007). Nixon & Mao: The Week that Changed the World. New York: Random House.
 Mann, James (1999). About Face. New York: Knopf.
 Nixon, Richard (1978). RN: The Memoirs of Richard Nixon. New York: Grosset & Dunlap.
 Tudda, Chris (2012). A Cold War Turning Point: Nixon and China, 1969–1972. Baton Rouge, LA: Louisiana State University Press.
 Tyler, Patrick (1999). A Great Wall: Six Presidents and China, Public Affairs.

External links 

Nixon's Trip to China, including the President's recollections documented on White House tapes , from the Richard Nixon Presidential Library
Index of articles on Nixon's foreign policy, including China, from the Richard Nixon Foundation
Webcast: Nixon in China, from the Council on Foreign Relations
Nixon's Trip to China: Records now Completely Declassified, Including Kissinger Intelligence Briefing and Assurances on Taiwan, from National Security Archive The George Washington University

1972 in the United States
China–United States relations
1972 in China
China
Diplomatic conferences in China
20th-century diplomatic conferences
1972 in international relations
United States presidential visits
Mao Zedong
Henry Kissinger
February 1972 events in Asia
Zhou Enlai